

Champions

Major League Baseball
World Series: St. Louis Cardinals over Milwaukee Brewers (4-3)

World Series MVP:  Darrell Porter
American League Championship Series MVP: Fred Lynn
National League Championship Series MVP: Darrell Porter
All-Star Game, July 13 at Olympic Stadium: National League, 4–1; Dave Concepción, MVP

Other champions
Amateur World Series: South Korea
Caribbean World Series: Leones del Caracas (Venezuela)
College World Series: Miami (Florida)
Cuban National Series: Vegueros
Japan Series: Seibu Lions over Chunichi Dragons (4–3)
Korean Series: OB Bears over Samsung Lions
Big League World Series: Puerto Rico
Junior League World Series: Tampa, Florida
Little League World Series: Kirkland National, Kirkland, Washington
Senior League World Series: Santa Barbara, California

Awards and honors
Baseball Hall of Fame
Hank Aaron
Happy Chandler
Travis Jackson
Frank Robinson
Most Valuable Player
Robin Yount, Milwaukee Brewers, SS (AL)
Dale Murphy, Atlanta Braves, OF (NL)
Cy Young Award
Pete Vuckovich, Milwaukee Brewers (AL)
Steve Carlton, Philadelphia Phillies (NL)
Rookie of the Year
Cal Ripken Jr., Baltimore Orioles, SS (AL)
Steve Sax, Los Angeles Dodgers, 2B (NL)
Woman Executive of the Year (major or minor league): Linda Pereria, San Jose Missions, California League
Gold Glove Award
Eddie Murray (1B) (AL)
Frank White (2B) (AL)
Buddy Bell (3B) (AL)
Robin Yount (SS) (AL)
Dwight Evans (OF) (AL)
Dwayne Murphy (OF) (AL)
Dave Winfield (OF) (AL)
Bob Boone (C) (AL)
Ron Guidry (P) (AL)
Keith Hernandez (1B) (NL)
Manny Trillo (2B) (NL)
Mike Schmidt (3B) (NL)
Ozzie Smith (SS) (NL)
Andre Dawson (OF) (NL)
Garry Maddox (OF) (NL)
Dale Murphy (OF) (NL)
Gary Carter (C) (NL)
Phil Niekro (P) (NL)

MLB statistical leaders

Major league baseball final standings

Events

January–April
January 9 – Tony Conigliaro whose career was ended in 1967 when he was hit by a pitch, suffers a massive heart attack on his way to the airport. The heart attack leaves Conigliaro in an unresponsive state of which he'd remain until his death in 1990.
January 13 – Hank Aaron and Frank Robinson become the 12th and 13th players elected to the Hall of Fame by the Baseball Writers' Association of America in their first year of eligibility. Aaron fell nine votes shy of becoming the first unanimous selection, and his 97.8 election percentage is second only to Ty Cobb's 98.2 percent in the inaugural 1936 election.
January 22 – Reggie Jackson signs with the California Angels, thus ending his five-year stay with the New York Yankees
January 27 – The Chicago Cubs complete a trade with the Philadelphia Phillies that sees Iván DeJesús go to the Phillies for Larry Bowa, and  Minor League prospect Ryne Sandberg also goes to the Cubs.
February 8 – The Los Angeles Dodgers trade away Davey Lopes to the Oakland Athletics.  This trade breaks up the starting infield of Lopes (second base), Ron Cey (third base), Bill Russell (shortstop), and Steve Garvey (first base), which had been together since 1974;  the longest intact infield in Major League Baseball history.
February 11 – In a trade of shortstops, the St. Louis Cardinals acquire Ozzie Smith from the San Diego Padres for Garry Templeton.
March 10 – Former New York Giants shortstop Travis Jackson and former baseball commissioner Happy Chandler are elected to the Hall of Fame by the Special Veterans Committee. Jackson hit .291 in 15 seasons between the 1920s and 1930s, while Chandler was the second commissioner and oversaw – and encouraged – the dismantling of the color barrier in 1947.
March 27 – The first game is played in the history of the KBO League, the major professional baseball league of South Korea.
April 1 – The New York Mets trade Lee Mazzilli to the Texas Rangers for Ron Darling and Walt Terrell.
April 6:
 In Minneapolis, the Hubert H. Humphrey Metrodome debuts for major league baseball, as the Seattle Mariners outslug the Minnesota Twins 11–7.  Dave Engle of the Twins christens the Dome with its first home run; third baseman Gary Gaetti, who earlier was thrown out trying to stretch a triple into an inside-the-park home run, adds two homers (over the fence) for the 52,279 in attendance.  Muriel Humphrey, the widow of the 38th Vice President of the United States, threw out the first pitch.
A blizzard unprecedented in size for April dumps 1–2 feet of snow on the northeastern United States, closing schools and businesses, snarling traffic, and canceling several major league baseball games.
April 13 – It's opening day at Shea Stadium as the Mets behind Randy Jones beat Steve Carlton and the Phillies 5-2 before a crowd of 40,845, the highest opening day crowd at Shea since 1970. Dave Kingman went 2 for 3 including his 2nd home run of the season.
April 20 – Before a crowd of 37,268—the largest crowd to see a game at Atlanta–Fulton County Stadium this season—the Atlanta Braves beat the Cincinnati Reds 4–2 to go 12–0, the best start ever by any Major League team. Steve Bedrosian was the winning pitcher. The streak would reach 13 the next day as the Braves beat the Reds 4–3.

May–June
May 6 – Gaylord Perry of the Seattle Mariners becomes the 15th pitcher with 300 career wins.
May 9:
The New York Mets' Rusty Staub hits a game winning home run off Greg Minton of the San Francisco Giants. The home run ends Minton's streak of 254 innings without allowing a long ball. This still stands as the longest streak in the live-ball era, if not ever.
Angry at the release of second baseman Rodney Scott, left-hander Bill "Spaceman" Lee spends the first six innings of the Montreal Expos' 5–4 loss to the Los Angeles Dodgers shooting pool and drinking beer at a local tavern. He returns to Olympic Stadium in the seventh and, after the game, leaves his uniform in manager Jim Fanning's office. Shortly thereafter, Lee is released.
May 25 – In the third inning against the San Diego Padres, Ferguson Jenkins, playing for the Chicago Cubs, becomes the seventh pitcher to record 3,000 strikeouts.  His victim is Garry Templeton of the Padres.
May 30 – Cal Ripken Jr. starts at third base for the Baltimore Orioles against the Toronto Blue Jays.  It is the first game of his record-breaking 2,632 consecutive games played streak.  Coincidentally, tomorrow, May 31, will be the fifty-seventh anniversary of the start of Lou Gehrig's streak, which Ripken will break.
June 1 – Rickey Henderson's two-run fifth-inning homer paced the Oakland Athletics to a 3-2 win over the Boston Red Sox. Henderson also stole his 51st stolen base in 51 games.
June 2 – The Milwaukee Brewers, 23–24 on the season and 7 games out of first place, fire Buck Rodgers as their manager. Harvey Kuenn replaces him and will guide the Brewers to victory in 20 of their next 27 games, the Brewers taking over first place on July 11. The team soon to be known as "Harvey's Wallbangers" will go on to win the American League East title and their only American League pennant.
June 6 – While crossing a street in Arlington, Texas after umpiring a game between the Chicago White Sox and 
Texas Rangers, umpire Lou DiMuro is struck by a car; he dies early the next day. Major League Baseball later retires his uniform number 16.
June 8 – Bob Boone's two-run double keyed a four-run fourth inning and Reggie Jackson slammed a solo homer, as the California Angels snapped a seven-game losing streak with a 11-4 win over the Toronto Blue Jays.
June 20 – Pete Rose becomes only the fifth player in history to play in 3,000 Major League baseball games.

July-August
July 13 – At Montreal's Olympic Stadium, in the first All-Star Game held outside the United States, Cincinnati Reds shortstop Dave Concepción hits a two-run home run in the second inning to spark the National League to a 4–1 win over the American League. It's the NL's 11th straight victory and 19th in the last 20 contests. Concepción wins the MVP honors.
July 19 – Tony Gwynn of the San Diego Padres makes his Major League debut. His double and single will be the first two hits of the over 3,000 he will accumulate in his Hall of Fame career.
July 29 – The Atlanta Braves were in first place in the National League West, 9 games ahead of the San Diego Padres when owner Ted Turner decides to remove the elevated tipi of mascot Chief Noc-A-Homa from the stands to allow more seats to be sold for the Braves' run at the division title. The Braves, however, lose 19 of their next 21 games, falling into third place before the tipi is restored.
August 4 – Joel Youngblood of the New York Mets goes 1-for-2 off Ferguson Jenkins of the Chicago Cubs in a day game at Wrigley Field in Chicago.  He is informed that he has been traded to the Montréal Expos, and leaves immediately for Philadelphia to meet the team there.  He arrives in time to play, and enters the game in the sixth inning, getting a hit off Steve Carlton.  He is the first player in Major League history to hit safely for two different teams on the same day.
August 7 – In the fourth inning of a game at Fenway Park between the Boston Red Sox and the Chicago White Sox, 4-year old Jonathan Keane is hit in the head with a foul line drive hit into the stands by Dave Stapleton.  The hit causes Keane's skull to bleed profusely, and Jim Rice quickly enters the stands and carries Keane inside the dugout to the Red Sox trainer's room, where team doctors take over.  Rice plays the remainder of the game with a blood-stained uniform.  Keane, meanwhile, recovers at a nearby children's hospital and Rice and the team doctors are credited with saving his life. After visiting Keane in the hospital, Rice stops by the hospital's business office and instructs that the family's bill be sent to him to pay.
August 8 – Rollie Fingers earns the 300th save of his career, becoming the first pitcher in history to achieve that mark.  He saves a 3–2 win for the Milwaukee Brewers vs the Seattle Mariners in Seattle.
August 10 – For the first time this season, the Atlanta Braves are out of first place in the National League West. They lose to the San Francisco Giants 3–2 at Candlestick Park as the Giants' Milt May hits the game-winning home run off Al Hrabosky in the seventh inning; the loss is Atlanta's eighth consecutive and 12th in their last 13 games. Meanwhile, the Los Angeles Dodgers, who had trailed the Braves by 10 games less than two weeks earlier, defeat the Cincinnati Reds at Dodger Stadium 11-3 as Rick Monday and Steve Garvey both homer. The victory is the eighth consecutive and 12th in the last 13 games for the Dodgers, who had swept two four-game series from the Braves during this comeback—one at Atlanta–Fulton County Stadium at the beginning and another at Dodger Stadium (the first three coming in extra innings) just prior to the Cincinnati series. The Braves had been in first place since winning their first 12 games of the season.
August 23 – Even though he has made no secret that he occasionally employs the spitball, Gaylord Perry is ejected from a game versus the Boston Red Sox for throwing the illegal pitch—the only such ejection in his career.
August 27 – Rickey Henderson steals four bases, breaking the record he had shared with Lou Brock at 118 stolen bases for the season.  He will steal eight more to end the season with a record of 130.

September–October
September 5 – Roy Smalley of the New York Yankees hits a pair of three-run home runs, one from each side of the plate, as New York beats the Kansas City Royals 18–7.
September 6 – Veteran first baseman Willie Stargell, whose jersey #8 is retired, is saluted by 38,000 fans on his day at Pittsburgh's Three Rivers Stadium. The 41-year-old slugger delivers a pinch single in the Pirates' 6–1 win over the Mets.
September 12 – Minnesota Twins pitcher Terry Felton takes the loss today, his thirteenth of the year against no wins.  He'll not pitch for a decision again. Coupled with his 1980 record of 0–3, Felton's 0-16 major league career sets a futility record for the most losses without a big league win.
October 1 – Through seven innings, the New York Mets' Terry Leach and the Philadelphia Phillies' John Denny have each only given up one hit. Denny is lifted in the ninth for a pinch hitter, however, Leach remains in the game through the tenth inning without giving up a second hit. A sacrifice fly by Hubie Brooks in the tenth inning off Larry Anderson is the deciding factor in the Mets' 1–0 victory at Veterans Stadium.
October 3:
 At Baltimore's Memorial Stadium, The American League East title was decided before an ABC television audience. Robin Yount hit two home runs and Don Sutton outdueled Jim Palmer as the Milwaukee Brewers beat the Baltimore Orioles 11–2 to capture the AL East title. It was also to have been Earl Weaver's last game as an Orioles manager, but he would come out of retirement to manage the O's again from 1985 to 1986.
At San Francisco's Candlestick Park, a 3-run home run by Joe Morgan helped the San Francisco Giants beat the Los Angeles Dodgers 5-3 and knocked the Dodgers out of the postseason and the Atlanta Braves became NL West Champions.
October 6 – The Atlanta Braves and St. Louis Cardinals play four innings of Game 1 of the 1982 NLCS when rain halts play in the bottom of the fifth with the Cardinals batting, three outs away from being an official game, and the Braves ahead, 1–0.  The rain does not subside and the game is called.  The Cardinals would go on to sweep the Braves and reach the 1982 World Series.
October 10 – After being down 2–0 to the California Angels, the Milwaukee Brewers complete a three-game comeback, defeating the Angels 4–3 to capture their only American League Championship.  Fred Lynn of the losing Angels is named the Most Valuable Player of the Series after going 11-for-18 with 5 RBI and 4 runs scored.  On the same date, the St. Louis Cardinals defeated the Atlanta Braves 6–2, to capture their first National League championship in 14 years.  Darrell Porter was the MVP of the NLCS with his five-for-nine effort, including three doubles.
October 12:
The first game of the 1982 World Series features Paul Molitor setting a new World Series record with five hits (in five at bats), as he leads the Milwaukee Brewers to a 10–0 victory over the St. Louis Cardinals in St. Louis.
The Montreal Expos' Tim Raines enters treatment for drug abuse. Raines claims to have spent a fifth of his salary on cocaine when he stole a National League-leading 78 bases during the regular season, and says he started sliding head first to avoid breaking the vial of cocaine he kept in his back pocket.
October 17 – In Game 5 of the 1982 World Series, a 6-4 Brewers victory, Robin Yount powers the Brewers with four hits, including a home run and a double. Along with his four-hit effort in Game 1, Yount becomes the first player ever to have two four-hit games in a single World Series.
October 20:
The St. Louis Cardinals win the 1982 World Series over the Milwaukee Brewers in seven games. Catcher Darrell Porter is selected the Series MVP, making him the first player to be chosen as the MVP in both the LCS and World Series in the same season.  This was the Cardinals' first World Series championship since 1967.
After 3 seasons of reviving baseball in Oakland, Oakland A's team president Roy Eisenhardt fired manager Billy Martin. In those 3 seasons, Martin compiled a 215–218 record and was named Associated Press American League manager of the year in 1980.
October 26 - Steve Carlton of the Philadelphia Phillies won his 4th Cy Young Award, in that season he won 23 games, the ONLY pitcher to win 20 games in the 1982 MLB season.

November–December
November 9 - Robin Yount of the Milwaukee Brewers was named American League MVP. During the Brewers' American League Championship season, he batted .318 with 21 home runs and 103 RBIS and even 19 steals.
November 17 – Center fielder Dale Murphy wins the National League MVP Award, becoming the first Braves player to be so honored since Hank Aaron in 1957. Murphy hit .281 with 36 home runs, 109 RBI, 113 runs, and 23 stolen bases.
November 22 – Second baseman Steve Sax of the Los Angeles Dodgers is named National League Rookie of the Year, becoming the fourth consecutive player from the Dodgers to win the award. Sax hit .282 and stole 49 bases as the replacement for Davey Lopes in the Dodgers infield.
November 24 – Cal Ripken Jr., who hit .264 with 28 home runs and 93 RBI as a shortstop and third baseman for the Baltimore Orioles, is named American League Rookie of the Year. Ripken Jr. gets 24 of 28 first place votes, with the others going to Kent Hrbek of the Minnesota Twins.
December 16 – The New York Mets send Lloyd McClendon, Charlie Puleo and minor leaguer Jason Felice to the Cincinnati Reds to reacquire Tom Seaver.
December 21 – The dismantling of the long-time Los Angeles Dodgers infield continues as its most popular member, Steve Garvey, signs as a free agent with the San Diego Padres.

Births

January
January 4 – Jason Bourgeois
January 5 – Norichika Aoki
January 5 – Dushan Ruzic
January 6 – Brian Bass
January 6 – Scott Thorman
January 7 – Brayan Peña
January 7 – Francisco Rodríguez
January 9 – Tony Peña
January 12 – Chris Ray
January 12 – Dontrelle Willis
January 15 – Melvin Dorta
January 15 – Armando Galarraga
January 19 – Terry Evans
January 23 – Wily Mo Peña
January 30 – Jorge Cantú
January 31 – Yuniesky Betancourt
January 31 – Brad Thompson

February
February 1 – Jean Machi
February 10 – Jamie Vermilyea
February 16 – Manny Delcarmen
February 17 – Brian Bruney
February 19 – Chris Stewart
February 20 – Jason Hirsh
February 21 – Edwin Bellorín
February 22 – Kelly Johnson
February 22 – Adalberto Méndez
February 24 – Nick Blackburn
February 24 – J. D. Durbin
February 24 – Gustavo Molina

March
March 6 – Cristhian Martínez
March 8 – Craig Stansberry
March 11 – Brian Anderson
March 12 – Zach Miner
March 15 – Steven Jackson
March 16 – Brian Wilson
March 17 – A. J. Murray
March 18 – Chad Cordero
March 18 – Carlos Guevara
March 19 – Landon Powell
March 21 – Aaron Hill
March 22 – Mike Morse
March 24 – Corey Hart
March 24 – Dustin McGowan
March 24 – Heath Phillips
March 24 – Robinson Tejeda
March 26 – Brendan Ryan

April

April 8 – Kason Gabbard
April 9 – Chad Reineke
April 10 – Chris Dickerson
April 10 – Andre Ethier
April 10 – Colt Morton
April 12 – Justin Ruggiano
April 14 – Josh Whitesell
April 15 – Michael Aubrey
April 22 - Andrew Graham
April 22 – David Purcey
April 25 – Brian Barton
April 26 – Alejandro Machado
April 28 – Jim Miller

May
May 3 – Bob McCrory
May 3 – Nick Stavinoha
May 4 – Matt Tolbert
May 7 – Conor Jackson
May 7 – Luis Jiménez
May 8 – Adrián González
May 12 – Jamie D'Antona
May 14 – Kevin Melillo
May 15 – Rafael Pérez
May 16 – Eugenio Vélez
May 17 – Nick Masset
May 21 – Ed Lucas
May 24 – Kevin Frandsen
May 25 – Jason Kubel
May 25 – Brad Snyder
May 26 – Joe Koshansky
May 26 – Carlos Martínez
May 28 – Jhonny Peralta
May 29 – Matt Macri

June
June 2 – Tim Stauffer
June 7 – Virgil Vasquez
June 9 –  Buck Coats
June 11 – Bobby Keppel
June 11 – Josh Newman
June 14 – Mike Hollimon
June 19 – Dusty Brown
June 21 – Dae-ho Lee
June 21 – Arnie Muñoz
June 22 – Ian Kinsler
June 22 – Jason Motte
June 23 – Matt Daley
June 25 – Paul Maholm
June 29 – Dusty Hughes
June 30 – Mitch Maier
June 30 – Delwyn Young

July
July 1 – Justin Huber
July 3 – Logan Kensing
July 8 – Renyel Pinto
July 12 – Tom Gorzelanny
July 13 – Shin-Soo Choo
July 13 – Yadier Molina
July 14 – Enrique González
July 15 – Fernando Nieve
July 15 – Seung-hwan Oh
July 15 – Ryan Wagner
July 16 – Jason Windsor
July 17 – Brian Rogers
July 18 – Josh Banks
July 19 – Phil Coke
July 20 – Jake Fox
July 20 – Jason Miller
July 22 – Rob Johnson
July 23 – Joe Mather

August
August 2 – Grady Sizemore
August 4 – Josh Roenicke
August 4 – Seiichi Uchikawa
August 6 – Justin Germano
August 8 – Matthew Brown
August 8 – Donny Lucy
August 8 – Ross Ohlendorf
August 10 – Josh Anderson
August 10 – Jeff Frazier
August 16 – Freddy Sandoval
August 17 – Travis Metcalf
August 18 – Josh Rupe
August 19 – J. J. Hardy
August 25 – Shayne Watson
August 26 – Jayson Nix
August 28 – Carlos Quentin
August 28 – Randy Wells
August 30 – Sean Marshall
August 31 – Josh Kroeger

September
September 2 – Jason Hammel
September 2 – Rommie Lewis
September 2 – Wes Littleton
September 3 – Bobby Livingston
September 8 – Geno Espineli
September 12 – Carmen Pignatiello
September 13 – Rickie Weeks
September 16 – Chris Carter
September 16 – Michael Martínez
September 16 – Ramón Ramírez
September 17 – Sean Burnett
September 17 – Danny Putnam
September 18 – Joe Bisenius
September 21 – Greg Burke
September 24 – Jeff Karstens
September 25 – Argenis Reyes
September 26 – Daniel McCutchen
September 28 – Héctor Giménez
September 28 – Micah Owings
September 30 – Seth Smith

October
October 3 – Brett Carroll
October 3 – Matt Young
October 4 – Tony Gwynn Jr.
October 4 – Ryan Sadowski
October 4 – Jered Weaver
October 5 – Mike Hinckley
October 9 – Jason Jaramillo
October 11 – Jeff Larish
October 12 – Casey McGehee
October 12 – Paul Janish
October 14 – Jerry Gil
October 14 – Carlos Mármol
October 17 – Abe Alvarez
October 18 – Ross Wolf
October 19 – J. A. Happ
October 21 – Jim Henderson
October 22 – Brian Bixler
October 22 – Robinson Canó
October 22 – Darren O'Day
October 22 – Carlos Torres
October 24 – Macay McBride
October 28 – Jeremy Bonderman
October 28 – Anthony Lerew
October 29 – Will Venable
October 30 – Anderson Hernández
October 30 – Jonathan Albaladejo
October 30 – Manny Parra
October 31 – Alex Hinshaw

November
November 2 – Yunel Escobar
November 4 – Travis Blackley
November 4 – Evan MacLane
November 4 – Chris Resop
November 5 – Bryan LaHair
November 7 – Brian Horwitz
November 10 – Matt Pagnozzi
November 14 – Angel Castro
November 14 – Fu-Te Ni
November 15 – Jerad Head
November 16 – Tim Wood
November 17 – Ty Taubenheim
November 18 – Brent Leach
November 19 – Jonathan Sánchez
November 29 – Tony Giarratano

December
December 2 – Wyatt Toregas
December 3 – Manny Corpas
December 4 – Matt Fox
December 8 – Alfredo Aceves
December 12 – Ervin Santana
December 13 – Ricky Nolasco
December 14 – Josh Fields
December 16 – Chris Britton
December 16 – Iván Ochoa
December 17 – Josh Barfield
December 17 – Juan Mateo
December 19 – Jeff Baisley
December 20 – David Wright
December 21 – Philip Humber
December 23 – Brad Nelson
December 25 – Rubén Gotay
December 27 – Michael Bourn
December 27 – Chris Gimenez
December 29 – Brad Davis
December 29 – Kevin Hart
December 30 – James Hoey
December 31 – Ronald Belisario
December 31 – Julio DePaula

Deaths

January
January 6 – Wally Post, 52, right fielder who played in 1,204 games, most notably with the Cincinnati Reds/Redlegs, between 1949 and 1964, and known for his home run power.
January 7 – Chet Falk, 76, left-handed pitcher who appeared in 40 games for the 1925–1927 St. Louis Browns.
January 12 – Curtis Henderson, 70, shortstop/third baseman for six Negro leagues teams between 1936 and 1946, including the New York Black Yankees and the Toledo/Indianapolis Crawfords; All-Star selection in 1940.
January 14 – Jesse Hubbard, 86, outfielder/pitcher whose career in the Negro Leagues and Black baseball extended from 1919 to 1935.
January 15 – Red Smith, 76, Pulitzer Prize-winning sportswriter whose career lasted from 1927 until his death; described by Ernest Hemingway as "the most important force in American sportswriting".
January 18 – Bob Addie, 71, sportswriter for Washington, D.C., newspapers for nearly 40 years who covered both Senators franchises.
January 18 – Bob Barrett, 82, infielder who played in 239 games for the Chicago Cubs, Brooklyn Robins and Boston Red Sox over five seasons spanning 1923 to 1929.
January 18 – Johnny Tobin, 61, third baseman who played in 84 games for the 1945 Red Sox and a mainstay of Pacific Coast League between 1948 and 1957; brother of Jim Tobin.
January 21 – Al Lefevre, 83, infielder who played in 21 games for the 1920 New York Giants.
January 23 – Jim Hopper, 62, pitcher who appeared in two games for 1946 Pittsburgh Pirates.
January 24 – Ben Shields, 78, left-handed pitcher who appeared in 13 games between 1924 and 1931 for the New York Yankees, Boston Red Sox and Philadelphia Phillies.
January 27 – Bill Haeffner, 87, catcher who appeared in 59 games over three seasons between 1915 and 1928, mainly for the 1920 Pittsburgh Pirates.
January 28 – Marion Cunningham, 86, first baseman who played in 131 games for the 1924–1925 Memphis Red Sox of the Negro National League.
January 28 – Hub Pruett, 81, nicknamed "Shucks", left-handed pitcher who went only 29–48 (4.63 ERA) in 211 appearances over seven years between 1922 and 1932, but as a rookie gained a lasting reputation for effectiveness against Babe Ruth.
January 28 – Paul Schreiber, 79, pitcher who appeared in dozen games for 1922–1923 Brooklyn Robins and 1945 New York Yankees; had a long post-playing career as a batting practice pitcher and coach for the Yankees and Boston Red Sox.
January 31 – Marvin Milkes, 58, baseball executive and general manager of 1969 Seattle Pilots and 1970 Milwaukee Brewers; immortalized in Jim Bouton's Ball Four.
January – Jimmy Ford, 69, outfielder who played for eight clubs, including the Memphis Red Sox, Harrisburg Stars and New York Black Yankees, in the Negro leagues between 1937 and 1945; selected an All-Star in 1941.

February
February 8 – Eddie Turchin, 64, infielder who played 11 games for the 1943 Cleveland Indians.
February 12 – Dale Alderson, 63, pitcher who made 16 total appearances for 1943–1944 Chicago Cubs.
February 17 – Nestor Chylak, 59, American League umpire from 1954 to 1978 who worked in five World Series and six All-Star games; elected to the Baseball Hall of Fame in 1999.
February 21 – Ray Shearer, 52, outfielder and minor-league veteran who received a brief trial with 1957 Milwaukee Braves, appearing in two games and garnering three plate appearances.
February 28 – Roy Sherid, 75, pitcher who went 23–24 (4.71 ERA) with six saves in 87 games for the 1929–1931 New York Yankees.

March
March 4 – Bill DeWitt, 79, executive who spent more than 60 years in major leagues, beginning by selling soda pop as a teen; general manager (1936–1951), minority owner (1936−1948) and principal owner (1949–1951) of St. Louis Browns; general manager (1961–1966) and owner (1962–1966) of Cincinnati Reds; president of Detroit Tigers (1959–1960); board chairman of Chicago White Sox (1976–1981); father and grandfather of owners or senior baseball executives.
March 8 – Tom Hussey, 71, sportscaster who described games of the Boston Red Sox (1939–1953) and Boston Bees/Braves (1939–1950).
March 12 – Bill Andrus, 74, third baseman and pinch hitter who appeared in six MLB games in trials for the 1931 Washington Senators and 1937 Philadelphia Phillies.
March 15 – Eddie Mulligan, 87, banjo-hitting third baseman/shortstop in 350 games for the 1915–1916 Chicago Cubs, 1921–1922 Chicago White Sox, and 1928 Pittsburgh Pirates; fixture as a player in the Pacific Coast League between 1919 and 1938, then served as president of the California League from 1956 to 1975.
March 17 – Lunie Danage, 86, second baseman and third baseman who appeared in 57 games for the 1920 St. Louis Giants of the Negro National League.
March 21 – Ollie Sax, 77, who appeared in 16 games as a third baseman and pinch runner for the 1929 St. Louis Browns of the American League.

April
April 4 – Eli Chism, 65, outfielder for the 1946 Cleveland Buckeyes and 1947 Birmingham Black Barons of the Negro American League.
April 4 – Mel Queen, 64, pitcher who worked in 146 games over eight seasons spanning 1942 to 1952 for the New York Yankees and Pittsburgh Pirates; father of the MLB pitcher/outfielder and manager.
April 8 – Alonzo Boone, 74, pitcher who spent much of his Negro leagues tenure (1929 to 1947) with Cleveland-based teams; managed 1948 Buckeyes to a 39–37 record. 
April 9 – Francisco Barrios, 28, pitcher for the Chicago White Sox from 1974 to 1981; suffered a fatal heart attack on eve of 1982 season.
April 13 – Ray Knode, 81, first baseman/pinch runner in 109 games for Cleveland Indians from 1923 to 1926.
April 14 – Kermit Dial, 74, infielder for the Chicago American Giants, Columbus Blue Birds and Detroit Stars of the Negro leagues between 1932 and 1937.
April 24 – Buster Ross, 79, left-handed pitcher who appeared in 64 games, mostly as a reliever, for 1924–1926 Boston Red Sox.
April 27 – Truck Hannah, 92, catcher in 244 career games for 1918–1920 New York Yankees; played in minors for 28 seasons, 22 of them in the Pacific Coast League—18 of those spent with the Los Angeles Angels; charter member of the PCL Hall of Fame.
April 30 – Leo Dickerman, 85, pitcher who hurled in 89 career games for the Brooklyn Robins (1923–1924) and St. Louis Cardinals (1924–1925).
April – Frank McCoy, 70, left-handed-hitting catcher whose Negro leagues career spanned 1929 to 1943 and included service with three Newark, New Jersey-based teams.

May
May 2 – Leo Callahan, 91, outfielder who got into 114 National League games with 1913 Brooklyn Superbas and 1919 Philadelphia Phillies.
May 6 – Beauty McGowan, 80, outfielder whose five MLB seasons were spaced over a 16-year span; appeared in 375 total games for 1922–1923 Philadelphia Athletics, 1928–1929 St. Louis Browns and 1937 Boston Bees.
May 9 – John Smith, 75, first baseman for the 1931 Boston Red Sox.
May 11 – Dave Malarcher, 87, infielder and manager in the Negro leagues who led the Chicago American Giants to World Series titles in 1926–1927 and the Indianapolis ABC's to a 1933 pennant.
May 17 – Dixie Walker, 71, five-time All-Star outfielder who batted .306 lifetime during an 18-season career with five MLB clubs and gained his greatest popularity ("The People's Cherce") with the Brooklyn Dodgers (1939–1947); NL batting champion in 1944; brother, son and nephew of major leaguers.
May 20 – Greene Farmer, 62, outfielder who appeared for Negro leagues clubs between 1942 and 1947.
May 29 – Erv Palica, 54, pitcher who worked in 246 career games for the Brooklyn Dodgers (1947–1951 and 1953–1954) and Baltimore Orioles (1955–1956).
May 30 – Charlie Gooch, 79, who appeared in 39 games as a pinch hitter, first and third baseman for the 1929 Washington Senators.

June
June 4 – Tony Kaufmann, 81, pitcher/outfielder for the Chicago Cubs, St. Louis Cardinals and Philadelphia Phillies for a dozen seasons between 1921 and 1935; later a coach for 1947–1950 Cardinals, scout, and minor-league manager.
June 7 – Lou DiMuro, 51, AL umpire since 1963 who worked two World Series, three ALCS and four All-Star Games.
June 8 – Irv Jeffries, 76, infielder in 175 career games with 1930–1931 Chicago White Sox and 1934 Philadelphia Phillies.
June 8 – Satchel Paige, 75, Hall of Fame pitcher in the Negro leagues, mainly with the Kansas City Monarchs, who was black baseball's biggest star for much of his career; won 28 major league games after debuting at age 42; in 1971 became the second Negro leaguer elected to Hall of Fame, behind Jackie Robinson who was elected in 1962; at age 59, threw three scoreless innings for the Kansas City Athletics against the Boston Red Sox on September 25, 1965.
June 11 – Jack Hallett, 67, pitcher for Chicago White Sox, Pittsburgh Pirates and New York Giants who appeared in 73 games over six seasons between 1940 and 1948.
June 12 – Webster McDonald, 82, pitcher in Negro leagues and Black baseball whose career lasted from 1922 to 1940; two-time Negro World Series champ as member of 1926–1927 Chicago American Giants; stalwart hurler for 1930s Philadelphia Stars, where he also was the player-manager from 1934–1936; led Negro National League pitchers in victories in 1935.
June 13 – Randy Bobb, 34, catcher who appeared in ten games for the 1968–1969 Chicago Cubs.
June 14 – Red Evans, 75, right-hander who posted a 1–11 won–lost record (6.21 ERA) in 25 career games for the 1936 Chicago White Sox and 1939 Brooklyn Dodgers, for whom he was the Opening Day starting pitcher in Leo Durocher's first game as an MLB manager.
June 27 – Eddie Morgan, 77, outfielder/first baseman for the St. Louis Cardinals and Brooklyn Dodgers, who hit a pinch-hit home run in his first major league at-bat.

July
July 1 – Footsie Blair, 81, infielder and pinch hitter in 246 games for 1929–1931 Chicago Cubs.
July 1 – Ray Scarborough, 64, pitcher who went 80–85 (4.13) in 318 games over ten MLB seasons (1942–1943 and 1946–1953) for five American League teams, most notably the Washington Senators; later, a longtime scout and special assistant for general manager Harry Dalton. 
July 3 – Spencer Harris, 81, outfielder who played in 146 big-league games for Chicago White Sox (1925–1926), Washington Senators (1929) and Philadelphia Athletics (1930), but logged 26 seasons in the minors between 1921 and 1948, and was credited with 3,617 hits.
July 6 – "Indian Bob" Johnson, 76, eight-time All-Star left fielder with the Philadelphia Athletics (1933–1942), Washington Senators (1943) and Boston Red Sox (1944–1945), who had eight 100-RBI seasons and scored 100 runs six times.
July 7 – "Jumping Joe" Dugan, 85, third baseman who appeared in 1,447 games for five MLB clubs between 1917 and 1931, notably the 1922–1928 New York Yankees, where he was a key member of three World Series champions, including the 1927 "Murderers' Row" edition.
July 11 – Chet Nichols, 85, pitcher who posted a 1–8 (7.19) record in 44 games for three NL clubs over six seasons between 1926 and 1932; father of pitcher Chet Jr.
July 14 – Jackie Jensen, 55, All-Star right fielder who starred for the Boston Red Sox; won the AL's 1958 MVP award and led the league in RBI three times, but retired at 34 due to an intense fear of flying; first athlete to play in both the World Series and football's Rose Bowl.
July 18 – Andy Anderson, 59, infielder who batted .184 in 223 at bats over 122 games for the 1948–1949 St. Louis Browns.
July 18 – Pete Layden, 62, NFL quarterback who also played in Major League Baseball in 41 games as a centerfielder for the 1948 Browns.
July 20 – Grover Froese, 66, American League umpire in 1952 and 1953.
July 22 – Lloyd Waner, 76, nicknamed "Little Poison", Hall of Fame center fielder who played in the Pittsburgh Pirates outfield next to his brother Paul; a career .316 hitter who led the NL in hits, runs and triples once each, his 1967 Hall election made them the first brothers to be inducted.
July 23 – Roberto Peña, 45, Dominican shortstop/second baseman who played in 587 games for five teams over six seasons spanning 1965–1971; scored winning run in the 1969 San Diego Padres' first-ever National League victory.
July 24 – Lin Storti, 75, switch-hitting third baseman and second baseman for 1930–1933 St. Louis Browns, appearing in 216 career games.
July 27 – Sug Jones, 74, who batted .364 in an 11-game career with the 1932 Little Rock Grays of the Negro Southern League as a first baseman, center fielder and catcher.
July 28 – Lefty Wallace, 60, pitcher who appeared in 51 games for the Boston Braves (1942 and 1945–1946).
July 29 – Lute Boone, 92, infielder who appeared in 315 career games for the 1913–1916 New York Yankees and 1918 Pittsburgh Pirates.

August
August 8 – Al Gould, 89, pitcher for two seasons with the Cleveland Indians (1916–1917).
August 20 – Hank Johnson, 76, pitcher for the New York Yankees, Boston Red Sox, Philadelphia Athletics and Cincinnati Reds, who had several victorious seasons as a Yankee in the 1930s.
August 22 – Ebba St. Claire, 61, catcher for the Boston/Milwaukee Braves and New York Giants from 1951 to 1954; father of Randy St. Claire.
August 23 – Henry Merchant, 64, outfielder/pitcher/first baseman for the Chicago American Giants and Cincinnati–Indianapolis Clowns of the Negro American League, 1940 to 1948.
August 25 – Ray Steineder, 87, relief pitcher who appeared in 29 total games for the 1923–1924 Pittsburgh Pirates and 1924 Philadelphia Phillies.
August 29 – Charlie Niebergall, 83, catcher in 54 games over three seasons (1921, 1923–1924) for the St. Louis Cardinals; later, a scout.

September
September 4 – Buster Bray, 69, outfielder who played four games for 1941 Boston Braves.
September 5 – Tom Hurd, 58, pitched from 1954 through 1956 for the Boston Red Sox.
September 7 – Ken Boyer, 51, seven-time All-Star third baseman with the St. Louis Cardinals who won the NL's 1964 MVP award and five Gold Gloves; batted .300 five times and had eight 90-RBI seasons; member of 1964 World Series champions whose grand-slam homer in Game 4 provided all the runs in a 4–3 Redbird triumph; managed Cardinals from April 29, 1978, to June 8, 1980; brother of Clete and Cloyd Boyer.
September 18 – Clyde McCullough, 65, catcher who played 1,098 games for Chicago Cubs (1940–1943, 1945–1948 and 1953–1956) and Pittsburgh Pirates (1949–1952); minor league manager and instructor; coach for three MLB teams, serving as bullpen coach of San Diego Padres at the time of his death.
September 23 – Lefty Mills, 72, southpaw hurler who spent his entire 96-game MLB career with St. Louis Browns (1934 and 1937–1940).
September 29 – Monty Stratton, 70, All-Star pitcher for the Chicago White Sox who attempted to make a baseball comeback after a hunting accident cost him a leg, inspiring an Oscar-winning 1949 movie that featured actor James Stewart as Stratton.

October
October 4 – Red Barron, 82, appeared as a left fielder and pinch runner in ten games for the 1929 Boston Braves.
October 13 – Alonzo Perry, 60, pitcher/outfielder for the 1946 Homestead Grays (Negro National League) and 1947–1948 Birmingham Black Barons (Negro American League).
October 17 – Hank McDonald, 71, pitcher who appeared in 48 games as a member of the 1931 and 1933 Philadelphia Athletics and 1933 St. Louis Browns.
October 18 – Bob Vines, 85, relief pitcher in nine games for 1924 St. Louis Cardinals and 1925 Philadelphia Phillies.
October 19 – George Bradley, 68, center fielder and pinch hitter in four games for 1946 St. Louis Browns.
October 26 – Bud Podbielan, 58, pitcher for the  Brooklyn Dodgers, Cincinnati Reds and Cleveland Indians between 1949 and 1959.
October 29 – Bill O'Donnell, 56, sportscaster; member of the Baltimore Orioles' broadcast team from 1966 until ill health forced him to retire in early 1982; also served as #2 play-by-play man for NBC-TV's MLB Game of the Week.
October 29 – Tom Sheehan, 88, pitcher for four MLB clubs between 1915 and 1926 who went 1–16 for horrific 1916 Philadelphia Athletics squad; later a coach, scout and minor league skipper who became oldest rookie manager in big-league annals when, at age 66, he was named pilot of the San Francisco Giants on June 18, 1960.
October 29 – Pinky Woods, 62, pitcher who hurled in 85 games for the wartime Boston Red Sox between 1943 and 1945.
October 31 – Sheriff Blake, 83, pitcher who appeared in 304 total games over ten seasons spanning 1920 to 1937 for five clubs, principally the Chicago Cubs; led NL in shutouts (4) in 1928.

November
November 2 – Bill Zuber, 69, pitcher who worked in 224 games for the Cleveland Indians (1936, 1938–1940), Washington Senators (1941–1942), New York Yankees (1943–1946) and Boston Red Sox (1946); member of 1943 World Series champions.
November 3 – Ray Fisher, 95, pitcher for the Yankees and Reds who started Game 3 of the 1919 World Series; coached at Michigan for 38 years, winning the 1953 College World Series.
November 6 – Al Baker, 76, pitcher for the Boston Red Sox in the 1930s.
November 7 – Jim Bivin, 72, pitcher for the 1935 Philadelphia Phillies.
November 12 – Cass Michaels, 56, All-Star second baseman for the White Sox, Senators, Browns and Athletics whose career ended prematurely when he was hit by a pitch in the head in 1954.
November 17 – Johnny Davis, 65, two-time All-Star outfielder for the 1940–1948 Newark Eagles of the Negro National League.
November 20 – Bob Short, 65, baseball and basketball club owner; bought expansion Washington Senators on December 3, 1968, moved them to Arlington, Texas, as the Texas Rangers after the 1971 season, then sold franchise to Brad Corbett on May 29, 1974; earlier, he owned the NBA's Minneapolis Lakers and moved them to Los Angeles in 1960, selling them to Jack Kent Cooke in 1965.
November 21 – Buck Marrow, 73, pitcher for 1932 Detroit Tigers and 1937–1938 Brooklyn Dodgers; worked in 39 career MLB games.
November 21 – Frank McCormick, 71, standout first baseman for Cincinnati Reds (1934; 1937–1945), Philadelphia Phillies (1946–1947) and Boston Braves (1947–1948); led National League in hits for three straight seasons (1938–1940, inclusive), doubles (1940) and runs batted in (1939); eight-time NL All-Star and 1940 Most Valuable Player; batted .299 lifetime with 1,711 hits; member of Cincinnati's 1940 World Series champions; later a Reds' broadcaster and coach.
November 22 – Roy Hofheinz, 70, former Houston mayor and county judge who was a founding co-owner of the Colt .45s/Astros franchise in 1959 and became majority owner six years later; driving force behind construction of the Astrodome, the first major-league domed stadium (opened in 1965); maintained controlling interest in the Astros until selling them in 1979.
November 26 – Hub Walker, 76, outfielder in 297 games in five MLB seasons spread over 15 calendar years (1931, 1935–1937, 1945) for the Detroit Tigers and Cincinnati Reds; member of Tigers' 1945 World Series champions; brother of Gee Walker.
November 29 – Al Cicotte, 52, well-traveled right-hander who pitched in 102 games over five seasons for the New York Yankees, Washington Senators, Detroit Tigers, Cleveland Indians, St. Louis Cardinals and Houston Colt .45s between 1957 and 1962.

December
December 4 – Duke Sedgwick, 84, pitcher in 21 career MLB games for the 1921 Philadelphia Phillies and 1923 Washington Senators.
December 9 – Jimmy Adair, 75, shortstop who played 18 games in MLB for 1931 Chicago Cubs; later a longtime coach (1951–1952; 1957–1965) and scout.
December 10 – Charlie Wheatley, 89, pitcher who posted a poor 1–4 (6.17 ERA) record for the 1912 Detroit Tigers (and set a record with five wild pitches in a single game), then became a millionaire entrepreneur and manufacturer after baseball.
December 22 – Tony Faeth, 89, relief pitcher who worked in 19 games for the 1919–1920 Cleveland Indians.
December 27 – Harry Kingman, 90, first baseman and pinch hitter in four games for the 1914 New York Yankees; the son of an American missionary, he is the only MLB player (as of 2022) to have been born in mainland China; after baseball, became a missionary himself as well as a civil-rights activist.

References